Proving Ground is an American reality television series that aired in the United States on G4. The series was hosted by Jackass cast and CKY crew member Ryan Dunn and video game journalist Jessica Chobot.

Synopsis
In each episode, Dunn and Chobot test concepts from pop culture such as video games, comics, television, and movies to see if those concepts are replicated easily in the real world. In the first episode the two tested the concept of a real life Super Mario Kart go-kart race with banana peels and Koopa Troopa "turtle shells". The series premiered on June 14, 2011 to 31,000 viewers. Most of the testing segments were filmed at the Saugus Speedway.

On June 20, 2011, series host Ryan Dunn died in a car crash in Pennsylvania. G4 immediately pulled the series from their schedule until network management could determine whether the remaining episodes should air. On June 27, 2011, G4 announced that the show would return on July 19, 2011, and that the remaining episodes would continue to air in the same time slot.

References

External links

 

2011 American television series debuts
2010s American reality television series
English-language television shows
G4 (American TV network) original programming
Television shows about video games
2011 American television series endings